David Williams (born June 17, 1994) is a former American football running back. He played college football at South Carolina and Arkansas.

Early years
Williams attended and played high school football at Imhotep Institute Charter High School.

College career
Williams played college football for South Carolina from 2014-2016. He transferred to Arkansas for the 2017 season.

Collegiate statistics

Professional career

Denver Broncos
Williams was drafted by the Denver Broncos in the seventh round (226th overall) of the 2018 NFL Draft. He was waived on September 1, 2018 and was signed to the practice squad the next day.

Jacksonville Jaguars
The Jacksonville Jaguars signed Williams off Denver's practice squad on October 9, 2018.
As a rookie, he appeared in six games and had eight carries for 36 rushing yards. On May 9, 2019, the Jaguars waived Williams.

Denver Broncos (second stint)
On July 19, 2019, Williams re-signed with the Denver Broncos. He was waived on August 31, 2019.

Detroit Lions
On September 11, 2019, Williams was signed to the Detroit Lions practice squad, but was released the next day.

Indianapolis Colts
On September 18, 2019, Williams was signed to the Indianapolis Colts practice squad, but was released two days later.

References

External links
Jacksonville Jaguars bio
Arkansas Razorbacks bio

1994 births
Living people
Players of American football from Philadelphia
American football running backs
South Carolina Gamecocks football players
Arkansas Razorbacks football players
Denver Broncos players
Jacksonville Jaguars players
Detroit Lions players
Indianapolis Colts players
Ed Block Courage Award recipients